Dave Osei (born July 7, 1983, in Amsterdam) is a Dutch-Ghanaian footballer who plays as a striker for DWS

Career
He began his career at AFC, before 2006 moving to Helmond Sport. He left Helmond 2007 and moved to FC Dordrecht, after one year was released.

External links
 Voetbalnext Player Profile
 Voetbal International Player Profile

References

1983 births
Living people
Dutch footballers
Ghanaian footballers
Helmond Sport players
Association football forwards
FC Dordrecht players
AFC DWS players
Eerste Divisie players
Dutch people of Ghanaian descent
Footballers from Amsterdam